The Millennium Falcon is a fictional starship in the Star Wars franchise. Designed by Joe Johnston for the movie Star Wars (1977), it has subsequently appeared in The Star Wars Holiday Special (1978), The Empire Strikes Back (1980), Return of the Jedi (1983), The Force Awakens (2015), The Last Jedi (2017), Solo: A Star Wars Story (2018), and The Rise of Skywalker (2019). Additionally, the Falcon appears in a variety of Star Wars spin-off works, including books, comics, and games; James Luceno's novel Millennium Falcon focuses on the titular ship. It also appears in the 2014 animated film The Lego Movie in Lego form.

The ship, a YT-1300 Corellian light freighter, is primarily commanded by smuggler Han Solo (Harrison Ford and Alden Ehrenreich) and his Wookiee first mate, Chewbacca (Peter Mayhew and Joonas Suotamo), and was previously owned by gambler/con-artist Lando Calrissian (Billy Dee Williams and Donald Glover). Solo: A Star Wars Story depicts the ship as being co-piloted by, and later integrated with, Calrissian's droid L3-37 (Phoebe Waller-Bridge). Described as being one of the fastest vessels in the Star Wars canon, the Falcon looks worn-out but despite its humble origins and shabby exterior, the Millennium Falcon has played a critical role in some of the greatest victories of the Rebel Alliance and the New Republic.

Origin and design
The ship originally had a more elongated appearance, but this design's similarity to the Eagle Transporters in Space: 1999 prompted Lucas to change the Falcons design. The original model was modified, re-scaled, and used as Princess Leia's ship, Tantive IV. Modelmaker Joe Johnston had about four weeks to redesign the Falcon, and Lucas' only suggestion to Johnston was to "think of a flying saucer". Johnston did not want to produce a "basic flying saucer", so he created the offset cockpit, forward cargo mandibles, and rear slot for the engines. It was also said that the shape of the ship was roughly based on a hamburger with an olive-on-the-side cockpit. The design was simple enough to create in the four-week window. Johnston called production of the new Falcon design one of his most intense projects.

The sound of the ship traveling through hyperspace comes from two tracks of the engine noise of a McDonnell Douglas DC-9, with one track slightly out of synchronization with the other to introduce a phasing effect. To this, sound designer Ben Burtt added the hum of the cooling fans on the motion-control rig at Industrial Light & Magic (ILM).

It has been noted that the cockpit with its greenhouse-style window was likely inspired by the cockpit of the American B-29 Superfortress.

Models and sets

Visually, the Millennium Falcon was represented by several models and external and internal sets. For Star Wars, a partial exterior set was constructed and the set dressed as Mos Eisley's Docking Bay 94 and the Death Star hangar. Besides the functional landing gear, an additional support held up the structure and was disguised as a fuel line. The interior set included the starboard ring corridor, the boarding ramp, cockpit access tunnel, gun turret ladder, secret compartments, and the forward hold. The cockpit was constructed as a separate set that could be rocked when the ship was supposed to shake. Several inconsistencies exist between the internal set and the external set, the cockpit access tunnel angle being the most noticeable.

The effects models for Star Wars matched the design of the exterior set. The primary model was five feet long and detailed with various kit parts. The ship was represented by a matte painting when Princess Leia (Carrie Fisher) sees it for the first time, showing the full upper surface. For the 1997 "Special Edition", a digital model replaces the effects model in several shots, and is used in a new shot of the Falcon lifting off from Docking Bay 94.

For The Empire Strikes Back (1980), a new external set was constructed. In spring 1979, Marcon Fabrications, a heavy engineering firm that served the UK's petrochemical and oil industries, was hired to build a movable full-scale external model capable of "moving as if it were about to take off." Built in secrecy under the project code name Magic Roundabout, the company leased the 1930s Western Sunderland Flying Boat hangar in Pembroke Dock, West Wales. It was then disassembled and shipped to Elstree Studios, Hertfordshire, for filming. Today, the Pembroke Dock museum has an exhibit about the project.

Along with the full-size mock-up of the Falcon, a new miniature model was created for The Empire Strikes Back to allow ILM to film more intricate in-flight rolls and pitches that were not possible with the five-foot model. This model was able to be mounted on a gimbal that allowed ILM to simulate very difficult maneuvers as the ship attempted to outrun Imperial TIE fighters during the asteroid-field-escape scene from the film. The new model, which measured at approximately 32 inches in length, had several surface features that differed from the five-foot model including updated landing gear and different surface greebles. The 32" model was the version of the Millennium Falcon most depicted in toys, model kits, and promotional materials for the Star Wars universe prior to the release of the sequel trilogy. The model was reused for Return of the Jedi (1983). At the end of this production, the model was destroyed.

As in Star Wars, the location set was changed around the ship set. The only major design change was to add landing gear where the disguised fuel line had been in Star Wars. As this set included the port side, that gave the set seven landing gears. The internal set was slightly refitted from A New Hope and featured a sliding cockpit door, a larger cargo hold, an additional corridor to port, and an equipment room. The cockpit was rebuilt slightly larger to allow more actors to fit comfortably; shots were apparently slightly cropped in later releases of the film to hide this alteration. Two new interior sets were created that are not shown to connect to the rest of the set: a top hatch that Lando Calrissian (Billy Dee Williams) uses to rescue Luke Skywalker (Mark Hamill), and the compartment where Luke rests on a bunk.

The  effects model from Star Wars was modified to reflect the additional landing gear, and several new models were built, including one roughly the size of a U.S. quarter dollar. For the 1997 Special Edition, a CGI model replaced the effects model during the approach and landing on Cloud City.

No new models or sets were created for Return of the Jedi. A portion of the full-scale ship was used for a scene cut from the film in which several characters board the Falcon in a sandstorm on Tatooine. In the scene when Han exacts a promise from Lando not to damage the Falcon, the Falcon is represented by a backdrop painting. It is also in a matte painting of the entire hangar bay.

The internal and external sets were scrapped after filming on Return of the Jedi ended. The effects models were kept by Lucasfilm and some have been on display from time to time.

A digital version of the Falcon appears briefly on Coruscant in Revenge of the Sith (2005). Lucas has confirmed that the ship is the Falcon and not another ship of similar design. A CGI version of the vessel also appears in the Disney attraction Star Tours: The Adventures Continue.

On June 3, 2014, TMZ confirmed that the Falcon would return for Star Wars: The Force Awakens when it leaked a photo from the set of the film, showing a full-scale version of the Falcon being built. An effects shot of the Falcon appears in the teaser trailer for The Force Awakens, released on November 28, 2014. This version of the ship is a digital recreation of the original 1977 five-foot model, with additional detailing reflecting the passage of time. The most noticeable change is the rectangular sensor array above the top hull, which replaces the circular dish from the first three films. 

On April 16, 2021, concept artist Phil Saunders shared some abandoned concept art, and explained that the actress Judi Dench could have been the original designer of Millennium Falcon in Star Wars: The Rise of Skywalker.

Depiction

Han Solo won the Millennium Falcon from Lando Calrissian in the card game 'sabacc' several years before the events of the original Star Wars film. In that movie, Obi-Wan Kenobi (Alec Guinness) and Luke Skywalker
(Mark Hamill) charter the ship in the Mos Eisley cantina to deliver them, C-3PO (Anthony Daniels), R2-D2 (Kenny Baker), and the stolen Death Star plans to Alderaan. When the Falcon is captured by the Death Star, the group conceal themselves in smuggling compartments built into the floor to avoid detection during a search of the ship. Solo later collects his fee for delivering them to the hidden Rebel base and departs under bitter circumstances, but returns to assist Luke in destroying the Death Star.

Solo pilots the Falcon, with Chewbacca, Leia, and C-3PO aboard, to elude the Imperial fleet in The Empire Strikes Back, wherein they take refuge at Cloud City, where Darth Vader (David Prowse/James Earl Jones) captures Solo. Lando Calrissian helps the others escape and, at the film's end, he departs in the Falcon to track down Solo and his captor, Jabba the Hutt. Calrissian again captains the Falcon during the climax of Return of the Jedi, with Nien Nunb as co-pilot, to destroy the second Death Star. Before the second Death Star is destroyed, Lando accidentally damages the ship by hitting the circular sensor rectenna dish on a random pipe or circuit in the second Death Star. Lando and the others still have success in destroying the Galactic Empire.

In Star Wars: The Force Awakens, set some 30 years after Return of the Jedi, the Falcon is in the possession of a scrap dealer named Unkar Plutt on the desert planet Jakku, having been stolen from Solo and Chewbacca some years prior. Scavenger Rey (Daisy Ridley) and former stormtrooper Finn (John Boyega) steal the Falcon in order to escape from an attack by the First Order, having been targeted for having the droid BB-8 in their possession. They are captured by a smuggling freighter, which turns out to be piloted by Solo and Chewbacca, who reclaim the Falcon. Forced to escape in the Falcon from an ambush by parties to whom Solo is heavily in debt, Solo reluctantly agrees to help Rey and Finn return BB-8 to the Resistance. After Rey is captured by the First Order, Solo agrees to take Finn in the Falcon to the First Order's new Starkiller Base—a planet that has been converted into the next generation of 'Death Star'—by attempting a risky maneuver of bypassing the planet's defences by exiting hyperspace in its atmosphere. When Solo is killed by his son, the rebels escape the destructing Starkiller Base. Later, Rey uses a newly-assembled map to travel to Ahch-To, the site of the first Jedi temple, to make contact with the long-lost Luke Skywalker, travelling in the Falcon in the company of Chewbacca and R2-D2.

The Falcon appears again in Star Wars: The Last Jedi, still on Ahch-To with Rey and Chewbacca. Later in the film, Chewbacca and Rey take the Falcon to the planet Crait, where the Resistance is under attack by the First Order. The Falcon loses its sensor dish for the third time on Crait, after it is shot off by a TIE fighter, but still manages to single-handedly take out most of the First Order's fighters on the planet while Luke distracts Kylo Ren. After the battle, surviving Resistance personnel leave Crait aboard the Falcon.

In The Last Jedi, Rey uses the Falcons escape pod to board Supreme Leader Snoke's flagship, the Mega-class Star Dreadnought Supremacy. Director Rian Johnson noted that he wanted its design to resemble a coffin, inspired by C.S. Lewis' Perelandra. The escape pod was monogrammed to say "Property of Han Solo". In the film Solo: A Star Wars Story, it is revealed that Lando modified the Falcon by putting an escape pod between the frontal 'mandibles', which Han jettisons to escape a gravity well.

In The Rise of Skywalker the Falcon is piloted by Lando Calrissian, Chewbacca and Wedge Antilles in the final battle of Exegol, leading the entire fleet of free worlds against the Sith Eternal forces.

Kessel Run
In the initial film, Solo brags that the Falcon "made the Kessel Run in less than twelve parsecs". As the parsec is a unit of distance, not time, different explanations have been provided. In the fourth draft of the script, Kenobi "reacts to Solo's stupid attempt to impress them with obvious misinformation." Lucas acknowledged the misnomer in 1977, saying that Han modified "the navigational system to get through hyperspace in the shortest possible distance". On the film's DVD audio commentary, Lucas further explained that in the Star Wars universe, traveling through hyperspace requires careful navigation to avoid stars, planets, asteroids, and other obstacles, and that is because no long-distance journey can be made in a straight line, the "fastest" ship is the one that can plot the "most direct course", thereby traveling the least distance.

In The Force Awakens, Rey references the Kessel Run but describes it as being completed in fourteen parsecs, after which Solo corrects her.

In Solo: A Star Wars Story, Solo's Kessel Run is depicted in detail, providing an explanation for the "twelve parsec" boast. Solo has to make many calculated jumps to avoid killing the crew. After integrating the memory module of Lando's damaged L3 droid into the ship's navigation, Solo is able to take a "shortcut" (which is dangerously close to a black hole). Chewbacca indicates the real distance was closer to 13 parsecs, but Solo insists, "Not if you round down," implying that the claim of "less than twelve parsecs" is slightly exaggerated.

Ownership
The Falcon has been depicted many times in the franchise, and its ownership and command have changed several times.
 Prior to A New Hope, the Falcon was in the possession of Lando Calrissian. He lost it to Han Solo in payment of a gambling debt.  This is depicted in Solo: A Star Wars Story, as well as the integration of Lando's droid L3-37 with the ship's computer.
 After Solo's capture by the Empire in The Empire Strikes Back, Lando, Chewbacca, and Leia take possession of the Falcon.
 During Return of the Jedi, Solo leaves Tatooine aboard the Millennium Falcon, and on arrival at the rendezvous for the Rebel fleet he lends the Falcon to Calrissian, who pilots it during the Battle of Endor and the destruction of the second Death Star.
 After the events of Return of the Jedi, the Falcon is stolen from Solo, ending up on the planet Jakku under the ownership of a scrap dealer, Unkar Plutt, 30 years after the Battle of Endor. In The Force Awakens, Rey and Finn commandeer the ship to escape the planet, only to be found by Solo and Chewbacca, who immediately reclaim the ship.
 After the death of Solo, Rey pilots the Falcon, with Chewbacca as her co-pilot. The novelization of The Force Awakens states that Chewbacca willingly abdicates captaincy of the Falcon to Rey.
 After the events of The Last Jedi, the ship becomes the base of operations for the remaining members of the Resistance.
 After the events of The Rise of Skywalker the Falcon is again piloted by Lando Calrissian with Chewbacca.

Cultural influence
Joss Whedon credits the Millennium Falcon as one of his two primary inspirations for his Firefly television show. The Falcon and the Falcon's distinct shape appear in Star Trek: First Contact, Blade Runner, Spaceballs, and Starship Troopers. The manga series Berserk includes a Millennium Falcon arc.

SpaceX states that their launch vehicles (except Starship) are named after the Millennium Falcon.

Biology
The middle Cambrian arthropod Cambroraster falcatus is named after the Millennium Falcon.

Toys

Kenner, Hasbro, Steel Tec, Master Replicas, Code 3 Collectibles and Micro Machines have all released Millennium Falcon toys and puzzles, including a Transformers version of the ship.

Hot Wheels has made a model of the ship for their Star Wars starship line and a version of it as a car. It is also available as a Hot Wheels playset.

Lego has released multiple versions of the Millennium Falcon in varying sizes. The 5,195-piece Lego model (part of the Star Wars "Ultimate Collectors Series") was physically the largest Lego set sold by the company, until it was topped in 2008 by the Lego Taj Mahal. In September 2017, Lego released an updated Millennium Falcon set in the Star Wars "Ultimate Collectors Series".  
With the new interior and more details compared to the 2007 model, the 7,541-piece model is the most expensive commercially available Lego set. Lego has also made a version of the Falcon to tie in with Solo: A Star Wars Story. It is called the Kessel Run Millennium Falcon.

Theme park attractions

On May 31, 2019, a full sized replica of the Falcon was opened to the public along with the rest of Star Wars: Galaxy's Edge at the Disneyland Resort in Anaheim, California, along with a flight simulator attraction,  Millennium Falcon: Smugglers Run, in which riders take control of the Falcon from inside its cockpit. An identical version of the attraction opened on August 29, 2019, at Disney's Hollywood Studios at the Walt Disney World Resort in Orlando, Florida.

A third incarnation of the attraction has been announced for Walt Disney Studios Park at the Disneyland Paris Resort in Marne-la-Vallée, France.

See also
List of Star Wars spacecraft

References 
Footnotes

Citations

External links 
 
  — Making of the Millennium Falcon, Millennium Falcon and Asteroids, Tour The Millennium Falcon with Donald Glover
  - Creating Lando's Millennium Falcon for Solo: A Star Wars Story, Behind the Magic of the Kessel Run
 
 Millennium Falcon Notes: information for model builders
 How Fast is the Millennium Falcon?: a thought experiment

Millennium Falcon
Fictional spaceplanes
Faster-than-light travel in fiction